Honky Tonk Angel is the 1972 debut solo album by Ellen McIlwaine, following her departure from Fear Itself. The first side of the album contains songs that were recorded live at The Bitter End in New York City while side two of the record is made up of studio recordings.

The album was re-released on CD in 1993 along with McIlwaine's 1973 album We the People as Up From the Skies: The Polydor Years.

Track listing

Side A
"Toe Hold" (Isaac Hayes, David Porter) – 4:32
"Weird of Hermiston" (Jack Bruce, Pete Brown) – 5:06
"Up From the Skies" (Jimi Hendrix) – 3:52
"Losing You" (Ellen McIlwaine) – 2:22
"Ode to Billie Joe" (Bobbie Gentry) – 4:13

Side B
"Pinebo (My Story)" (Guy Warren) – 2:41
"Can't Find My Way Home" (Steve Winwood) – 3:39
"Wings of a Horse" (Ellen McIlwaine) – 4:01
"It Wasn't God Who Made Honky Tonk Angels" (J.D. Miller) – 2:38
"Wade in the Water" (Traditional, adapted by Ellen McIlwaine) – 4:55

Personnel
Ellen McIlwaine - vocals, background vocals, guitars
Thad Holiday - bass, background vocals
Don Payne - bass (Side B, track 4)
Billy Curtis - congas (Side A, track 1; Side B, track 1)
Candido - congas (Side B, tracks 1, 3, 5)
Don Kaplan - piano
James Madison - drums
Bill Keith - pedal steel guitar

Sources

1972 debut albums
Ellen McIlwaine albums
Polydor Records albums